The Pratt & Whitney J48  (company designation JT7 Turbo-Wasp) is a turbojet engine developed by Pratt & Whitney as a license-built version of the Rolls-Royce Tay. The Tay/J48 was an enlarged development of the Rolls-Royce Nene (Pratt & Whitney J42).

Design and development

In 1947, at the behest of the United States Navy, Pratt & Whitney entered into an agreement to produce the Rolls-Royce Nene centrifugal-flow turbojet engine under license as the J42 (company designation JT6), for use in the Grumman F9F Panther fighter aircraft. Concerned that the Nene would not have the potential to cope with future weight growth in improved versions of the Panther, Luke Hobbs, vice president of engineering for P&W's parent company, the United Aircraft Corporation, requested that Rolls-Royce design a more powerful engine based on the Nene, which Pratt & Whitney would also produce.

By 1948, Rolls-Royce had designed the Tay turbojet, also a centrifugal-flow design. However, as Rolls-Royce was then developing an improved design with an axial compressor, which would become the Avon, the development and production of the Tay turbojet was left to Pratt & Whitney. However, Rolls-Royce retained the rights to the Tay outside of the United States.

The Tay/J48 was a thirty percent enlargement of the preceding Nene/J42, and was produced both with and without afterburning.

Operational history
Several aircraft types used the J48 engine during the 1950s, including the Grumman F9F-5 Panther. and Grumman F9F-6/F9F-8 Cougar, The U.S. Air Force's Lockheed F-94C Starfire and North American YF-93 used afterburning versions of the J48 engine.

Variants
Data from The Engines of Pratt & Whitney: A Technical History.

J48-P-1  dry,  thrust with afterburning
J48-P-2 ,  thrust with water injection
J48-P-3 ,  thrust with afterburning
J48-P-5 ,  thrust with afterburning
J48-P-6 ,  thrust with water injection
J48-P-6a ,  thrust with water injection
J48-P-7 ,  thrust with afterburning
J48-P-8  thrust
J48-P-8A  thrust
 Turbo-Wasp JT-7 Commercial engines / company designation

Applications
 Grumman F9F-5 Panther
 Grumman F9F-6/-8 Cougar
 Lockheed F-94C Starfire
 North American YF-93

Specifications (J48-P-8A)

See also

References
Notes

Bibliography

External links

 Pratt & Whitney History page on the J48

Tay
1940s turbojet engines
Centrifugal-flow turbojet engines